Geeta Vadhera is an Indian artist. She has exhibited her oil paintings and has published a book of poetry.

Early life 
Geeta Vadhera was born  in India to a father who was a poet and a mother who was an artist. She studied for a Bachelor of Arts at the College of Art, Delhi and undertook further research in France and Germany.

Career 
Geeta has shown her artworks in Asia, Australia and Europe. In 1986, she showed her paintings at the Orchard Point Gallery in Singapore and the following year at the Funan Centre. In 1988, she exhibited 24 paintings at the Arts Festival Fringe. In 2011, she took her oil paintings to Dubai. Her art has been inspired by the Sufi poetry of Bulleh Shah and the Isha Upanishad.

Geeta  has a studio and gallery in Gurugram, a satellite city of New Delhi. She published a book of poetry written in Hindi, entitled Ansh (A Part of Me) and also has written books about art for children. In 2021, she addressed a Horasis event discussing art after the COVID-19 pandemic in India.

Awards and recognition 
Geeta received the Bharat Nirman super achiever award in 1995.

See also
Modern Indian painting

References

20th-century Indian painters
Living people
Indian women painters
Jawaharlal Nehru Fellows
People from Gurgaon
Delhi University alumni
Women artists from Delhi
20th-century Indian women artists
Painters from Delhi
21st-century Indian women artists
Year of birth missing (living people)